Montenegrin Canadians (Montenegrin: Kanadski Crnogorci) are Canadian citizens of Montenegrin descent or Montenegro-born people who reside in Canada. According to the 2011 Census, 2,970 Canadians claimed full or partial Montenegrin ancestry, compared to 2,370 in 2006.

See also

Immigration to Canada
Montenegrins
European Americans
European Canadians

Notable people 
Milos Raonic - tennis player
Johnathan Kovacevic - hockey player

References

External links
Montenegrin Ethnic Association of Canada

 
Canadians
European Canadian